Toy Freaks was a controversial Elsagate YouTube channel run by Gregory Chism, a single father of two living in Granite City, Illinois. The channel was known for its videos featuring Chism and his two daughters in a variety of disturbing or inhumane situations. It was created in 2012 and terminated by YouTube in November 2017. The channel has been described as one of the first channels brought to light with the Elsagate phenomenon.

Gregory Chism
In an interview in January 2015, Chism described himself as a single father of two girls, Annabelle (age 4) and Victoria (age 6).

Controversy and termination

In November 2017, the Toy Freaks channel was highlighted by James Bridle in a Medium article, in which he wrote that the channel "...specialises in gross-out situations, as well as activities which many, many viewers feel border on abuse and exploitation, if not cross the line entirely, including videos of the children vomiting and in pain." When the channel was terminated by YouTube later that month, it had over 8.5 million subscribers, and was one of the 100 most-viewed channels on YouTube. YouTube removed the channel for violating its child endangerment policy, which they had recently revised in response to media coverage of supposedly child-friendly videos containing disturbing content on YouTube.

See also 
 FamilyOFive
 Elsagate

References

External links
Archived copy of Toy Freaks channel homepage

YouTube channels launched in 2012
English-language YouTube channels
Scandals in Illinois
2017 scandals
Entertainment scandals
People from Granite City, Illinois
American male comedians
2017 disestablishments in Illinois
American YouTubers
Child abuse
Child abuse in the United States
Child abuse incidents and cases
Online obscenity controversies
YouTube channels closed in 2017
YouTube controversies
Incidents of violence against girls